In enzymology, a beta-aspartyl-N-acetylglucosaminidase is an enzyme that catalyzes the chemical reaction

1-beta-aspartyl-N-acetyl-D-glucosaminylamine + H2O  L-asparagine + N-acetyl-D-glucosamine

Thus, the two substrates of this enzyme are 1-beta-aspartyl-N-acetyl-D-glucosaminylamine and H2O, whereas its two products are L-asparagine and N-acetyl-D-glucosamine.

This enzyme belongs to the family of hydrolases, specifically those glycosylases that hydrolyse N-glycosyl compounds.  The systematic name of this enzyme class is 1-beta-aspartyl-N-acetyl-D-glucosaminylamine L-asparaginohydrolase. This enzyme is also called beta-aspartylacetylglucosaminidase.

References

 

EC 3.2.2
Enzymes of unknown structure